Benson, Maryland may refer to:
Benson, Harford County, Maryland, an unincorporated community in Harford County
Benson, Howard County, Maryland, an unincorporated community in Howard County